Leirvikbogen or simply Bogen is a village in the municipality of Steigen in Nordland county, Norway. The Engeløy Bridges connect Bogen to the nearby island of Engeløya to the north. Bogen and its surrounding villages have a total of about 210 residents (2016). Bogen Chapel is located in the village.

References

Steigen
Villages in Nordland